The 2016 Americas Rugby League Championship was the first tri-nation rugby league competition between the national teams of the USA, Canada and Jamaica.

Results

References

Americas Rugby League Championship
2016 in Jamaican rugby league
2016 in Canadian rugby league
2016 in American rugby league